A renal oncocytoma is a tumour of the kidney made up of oncocytes, epithelial cells with an excess amount of mitochondria.

Signs and symptoms

Renal oncocytomas are often asymptomatic and are frequently discovered by chance on a CT or ultrasound of the abdomen. Possible signs and symptoms of a renal oncocytoma include blood in the urine, flank pain, and an abdominal mass.

Pathophysiology
Renal oncocytoma is thought to arise from the intercalated cells of collecting ducts of the kidney. It represent 5% to 15% of surgically resected renal neoplasms. Ultrastructurally, the eosinophilic cells have numerous mitochondria.

Histologic appearance

An oncocytoma is an epithelial tumor composed of oncocytes, large eosinophilic cells having small, round, benign-appearing nuclei with large nucleoli and excessive amounts of mitochondria.

Diagnosis

In gross appearance, the tumors are tan or mahogany brown, well circumscribed and contain a central scar. They may achieve a large size (up to 12 cm in diameter).

The main differential diagnosis of renal oncocytoma is chromophobe renal cell carcinoma oncocytic variant, which like the renal oncocytoma has eosinophilic cytoplasm, but has perinuclear clearing and, typically, some degree of nuclear atypia.

Immunohistochemical profile 
Cytokeratin AE1/AE3 +
Vimentin -
EMA +
CD10+/-
CK7 +/- parcellaire
CK20 -
CK19 -
AMACR (Racemase) - 
S100 +
c-kit (CD117) +
Cadherin-E +
TFE3 -
CAM5.2 +

Treatment
Renal oncocytoma is considered benign, cured by nephrectomy. There are some familial cases in which these tumors are multicentric rather than solitary. However, they may be resected to exclude a malignant tumor, e.g. renal cell carcinoma.

Prognosis

The overall five-year survival rate has been estimated to be 63%, with 100% disease-specific survival.

Additional images

See also
 Kidney
 Renal cell carcinoma

References

External links 

Benign renal neoplasms